PV Murray River Queen is an Australian paddle vessel built at Hindmarsh Island in 1974 as a luxury passenger cruise boat.  She was a tourist boat carrying passengers on the Murray River in South Australia. For many years, her home port was Goolwa where she offered week-long cruises operated by her builders, the Veenstra family. She was the first of several large boats built by the Veenstras for the Murray River, they later also built the MV Murray Explorer and PS Murray Princess. 

Murray River Queen retired from regular service in 1993, and spent ten years initially as a floating hotel at Goolwa, then being stored near Mannum. In 2003, she was moved to Waikerie, South Australia, running dinner cruises and occasional longer trips until 2012. For three years she operated as a working hostel for backpackers, then as nostalgic accommodation and a restaurant.

In August 2017, Murray River Queen was moved from Waikerie 200 km upstream to Renmark. As the ship was no longer registered and legal to cruise under her own power, the journey was made mostly under tow by PS Oscar W, a 109-year-old paddlesteamer that used to tow barges carrying wool from stations to the markets.  After some maintenance in the dry dock on Ral Ral Creek.Murray River Queen was then moored at the Renmark town dock as a tourist attraction, operating as a restaurant and bar. She formerly offered accommodation and live music on the top deck on weekends. In June 2021, D Neale became the new owner of Murray River Queen, and the rooms onboard the vessel were soon restored. An onboard café, Kings on Queen, currently operates while the vessel awaits approval for liquor licensing.

Technical details

Registration:
 Registration Opened: 1979
 Registration Closed: Current
 Registered Number: 385271
 Owner (at time of registration): Murray River Queen Pty Ltd. 

Measurements: 
 Engine: 205 Hp (Diesel)
 Dimensions: Length 156.36, Breadth 26, Depth 7.7 (feet)
 Tonnage: 878.97 
 Construction: Steel

References

External links 

 

1974 ships 
Paddle steamers of Australia
Passenger ships of Australia
Ships built in South Australia